Thomas Anthony Franckhauser (May 26, 1937 – April 17, 1997) was an American football cornerback who played in the National Football League for the Los Angeles Rams, the Dallas Cowboys, and the Minnesota Vikings.  He played college football at Purdue University.

Early years
Known as "Knute", Franckhauser was born in Steubenville, Ohio, and played high school football there at Catholic Central High School.

He accepted a scholarship from Purdue University, where he became a three-year starter at offensive end. In 1957, he helped his team upset Michigan State University, which was ranked number one in the nation at the time. As a senior, he was named the team's MVP.

Professional career

Los Angeles Rams
Franckhauser was selected by the Los Angeles Rams in the third round (33rd overall) of the 1959 NFL Draft. As a rookie, he was moved to cornerback, before finishing the season as a starter at safety. He tied for the team lead with 3 interceptions.

Dallas Cowboys
He was selected by the Dallas Cowboys in the 1960 NFL Expansion Draft. He became the first player in Dallas Cowboys history to carry the football during a regular season game as he returned the opening kickoff in their inaugural regular season game. He also became the first starter at left cornerback in franchise history. He registered 45 tackles, 13 passes defensed, 3 interceptions (tied for the team lead), 25 kickoff returns for an average of 19.8 yards and 3 punt returns.

In 1961, he was passed on the depth chart by Warren Livingston. He was activated on November 7 and played in only 6 games (4 starts), after Livingston was placed on the injured reserve list. On December 31, he was traded to the Cleveland Browns in exchange for punter Sam Baker.

Cleveland Browns
In September 1962, he was traded along with offensive tackle Errol Linden, offensive end Charley Ferguson and placekicker Fred Cox, to the Minnesota Vikings in exchange for a sixth round selection (#72-Ernie Borghetti).

Minnesota Vikings
In 1962, he was one of the key players in the Minnesota Vikings defense, finishing the year with 4 interceptions (tied for third on the team). In 1964, he suffered a near fatal brain injury while tackling rookie Bill McWatters in a training camp scrimmage. He would be lost for the season and forced into early retirement.

Personal life
On April 17, 1997, he died of a heart attack. His first cousin was Danny Abramowicz, who played college football at Xavier University and professionally as an original New Orleans Saint.

His twin grandsons, Walker Hume and Tucker Hume, are both professional soccer players with FC Dallas and Ottawa Fury FC respectively.

References

External links
 

1937 births
1997 deaths
Sportspeople from Steubenville, Ohio
Players of American football from Ohio
American football cornerbacks
Purdue Boilermakers football players
Los Angeles Rams players
Dallas Cowboys players
Minnesota Vikings players